BRP Cebu (PS-28) was a  of the Philippine Navy. She was decommissioned from the U.S. Navy and transferred to the Philippine Navy in July 1948 and renamed RPS Cebu (E-28) after the Philippine province of the same name. The ship was decommissioned on 1 October 2019. Along with other World War II-era ships of the Philippine Navy, Cebu was considered one of the world's oldest fighting ships during her active service.

History

Commissioned in the US Navy as USS PCE-881 in 1944, and patrolled the coast of Alaska during World War II. The ship was decommissioned after World War II.

She was then transferred and commissioned into the Philippine Naval Patrol and was renamed RPS Cebu (E-28) in July 1948. She was carried on to the Philippine Navy in 1950, and between 1965 and 1966 she was renamed as RPS Cebu (PS-28) using a new classification system. Again in June 1980 she was renamed BRP Cebu (PS-28) using a new localized prefix.

In 1992 the Cebu underwent major overhaul, weapons and radar systems refit, and upgrade of communications gear.

Cebu won the Philippine Navy "Ship of the Year" award for the year 2009.

She was assigned with the Patrol Force of the Philippine Fleet, under the jurisdiction of Naval Forces Western Mindanao.

She was decommissioned in a ceremony on 1 October 2019.

In October 2022, the Ship along with the BRP Rajah Humabon (PS-11) and BRP Sultan Kudarat (PS-22) was seen tilted over and submerged at the Naval Station Pascual Ledesma in Cavite after the onslaught of Severe Tropical Storm Nalgae.

Notable operations

After the ship's construction and the crew's training was completed in Portland Oregon, it patrolled the coast of Alaska from the Aleutian Islands to the Bering Strait during World War II. The ship's commanding officer was Lieutenant Commander W.W. Adams.

Between 19 and 22 March 1958, then RPS Cebu participated in the first bilateral exercise between the Philippine and US Navies dubbed Exercise "Bulwark One".  It took part on the 3rd phase of the exercise off the waters of Corregidor and Caballo Islands.

On 1968, during the height of the so-called 'Operation Merdeka', against the combined might of the Royal Navy and Royal Malaysian Navy ships, BRP Cebu stood her 'ground' to protect the maritime border of the Philippines and confronted the British-Malaysian warships raring to do a battle with her after learning that the Philippines is preparing to invade Sabah. The stand-off between the Philippine Navy and British-Malaysian Navy lasted for 10 tense hours giving the Philippine Navy patrol craft escort/corvette a victory for not yielding even an inch of the Philippine territory.

As of 23 June 2008, she and her onboard medical team participated in the search and rescue of the MV Princess of the Stars of Sulpicio Lines, which capsized off the coast of San Fernando, Romblon at the height of Typhoon Fengshen on 22 June 2008.

BRP Cebu and  have alternately secured the Southern Sulu Sea where the Baduria Well is located. She also provides security for the West Aquarius Oil Rig.

In middle of May 2018, the BRP Cebu participated in the Third Combined Maritime Security Activity with the Royal Australian Navy (RAN) along with the BRP General Mariano Alvarez (PS-38), BRP Anastacio Cacayorin (PS-381), BRP Dioscoro Papa (PG-381) and BRP Filipino Flojo (PG-386). The RAN sent the vessels HMAS Albany (ACPB 86) and HMAS Glenelg (ACPB 96) for the exercise.

In the latter part of May 2018, the BRP Cebu held a meeting with the Royal Malaysian Navy (RMN) ship, the KD Sri Tiga at the maritime border between Malaysia and the Philippines to exchange intelligence information as part of the Trilateral Maritime Patrol Programme in the Eastern Security Zone (Esszone) of Sabah.

Technical details
There are slight differences between the BRP Cebu as compared to some of her sister ships in the Philippine Navy, since her previous configuration was as an Escort-type ASW Patrol Craft (PCE, ie, equipment more on being a combatant), while the others are configured as Rescue-oriented ASW Escort Patrol Craft (PCER, ie, having more equipment to tend the wounded & such, like a small hospital ship), and as minesweepers (Admirable class) ships.

Armaments
Originally, the ship was armed with:SuW-AAW
1 × Mk.26 76mm (3-inch) 50L DP (dual-purpose) cannon
3 × (twin-barrel) Mk.1 Bofors 40mm AA cannons
4 × Mk.10 Oerlikon 20 mm AA cannons (or in 1 × quad-barrel config )
ASW
1 × Hedgehog antisubmarine mortar projector
4 × K-gun depth charge projectors
2 × depth charge racks
This configuration applies before its overhaul in the early 1990s. That config is what made her as a patrol corvette - an ASW vessel lower than a corvette.

During its overhaul and refit in 1992, the Philippine Navy removed her old anti-submarine weapons and systems, and made some changes in the armament set-up. Some sources claim the loss of its three Bofors 40mm cannons during the 1992-1993 overhaul and refit period, but photos  on 2009 show the Bofors guns still present, although in singles instead of twins. Thus, armaments fitout to the ship are:
 1 × Mk.26 76mm (3") 50L DP cannon (fore)
 3 × (single-barrel)Bofors 40mm close-in anti-air rapid-firing lite cannons (aft)
 4 × Mk.10 Oerlikon 20 mm close-in anti-air rapid-firing lite cannons (2 each on bridge wings) or only 3 cannons on this same source
 4 × M2 Browning 50cal (12.7mm) heavy machine guns (2 beside main bridge, 2 aft near the ship's end) [added during that refit] 
That above config made the ship lighter and ideal for surface patrols, but losing her limited anti-submarine warfare capability. She is then a gun-type corvette - an OPV more rugged, more heavily armed than the usual coastguard OPVs & other similar ones.

Electronics
Also during the refit the ship's SPS-21D surface search radar and RCA SPN-18 navigation radar was replaced by a Raytheon AN/SPS-64(V)11 surface search and navigation radar system. Later modifications included the installation of long range and satellite communications systems, and GPS system standard to all Philippine Navy ships.

Machinery
The ship is powered by two GM 12-278A diesel engines, with a combined rating of around  driving two propellers.

In popular culture
 BRP Cebu was the ship escorting a fictional Philippine Navy Whidbey Island-class LSD BRP Cagayan de Oro during a mission to reclaim the Mischief Reef from the Chinese in the 1997 novel Dragon Strike - The Millennium War by Humphrey Hawksley and Simon Holberton. In the said novel, the mission failed as Chinese Su-27s sank the Cagayan de Oro, and Chinese forces repulsed the attacks of the Philippine Marines to retake the reef. This resulted to the total withdrawal of the Philippines from the South China Sea war against China.

References

External links
 Philippine Defense Forum
 Philippine Navy @ Hazegray.org
 DLSU ROTC
 Opus224's Unofficial Philippine Defense Page
 NavSource Online: Patrol Craft Escort Photo Archive

PCE-842-class patrol craft
Ships built in Portland, Oregon
1943 ships
PCE-842-class patrol craft of the Philippine Navy
Miguel Malvar-class corvettes
Corvettes of the Philippines